Bangla is a 2019 Italian film directed by Phaim Bhuiyan.  The film premiered at the 2019 International Film Festival Rotterdam.

Thanks to this first movie, Bhuiyan won David di Donatello for Best New Director.

References

External links
 

Italian comedy films
2019 films
2010s Italian-language films
2010s Italian films
2019 comedy films